Gibbosporina didyma is a rare species of foliose lichen in the family Pannariaceae. It was described as a new species in 2016 by Arve Elvebakk, Soon Gyu Hong, and Per Magnus Jørgensen. The specific epithet didyma ("in pairs"), refers to the thallus being divided into a prominent cyanobiont in addition to the dominant chlorobiont, as well as to cephalodia that are sometimes divided by the developing apothecia of chlorobionts. The lichen is known from only two locations on Réunion and Mauritius; both are tropical forests at moderate altitudes, .

References

didyma
Lichen species
Lichens of Mauritius
Lichens of Réunion
Lichens described in 2016
Taxa named by Per Magnus Jørgensen
Taxa named by Arve Elvebakk